Switzerland competed at the 1948 Summer Olympics in London, England. 186 competitors, 178 men and 8 women, took part in 98 events in 19 sports.

Medalists

Athletics

Basketball

Boxing

Canoeing

Cycling

Eleven cyclists, all male, represented Switzerland in 1948.

Individual road race
 Jakob Schenk
 Jean Brun
 Walter Reiser
 Giovanni Rossi

Team road race
 Jakob Schenk
 Jean Brun
 Walter Reiser
 Giovanni Rossi

Sprint
 Jean Roth

Time trial
 Hans Flückiger

Tandem
 Jean Roth
 Max Aeberli

Team pursuit
 Walter Bucher
 Gaston Gerosa
 Eugen Kamber
 Hans Pfenninger

Diving

Equestrian

Fencing

19 fencers, 16 men and 3 women, represented Switzerland in 1948.

Men's foil
 Corrado Schlaepfer
 Walo Hörning
 Jean Rubli

Men's team foil
 Gottfried von Meiss, Roger Stirn, Walo Hörning, Corrado Schlaepfer, Jean Rubli

Men's épée
 Oswald Zappelli
 Robert Lips
 Rodolphe Spillmann

Men's team épée
 Fernand Thiébaud, Robert Lips, Jean Hauert, Oswald Zappelli, Otto Rüfenacht, Marc Chamay

Men's sabre
 Walter Widemann
 Otto Greter
 Alphonse Ruckstuhl

Men's team sabre
 Roland Turian, Alphonse Ruckstuhl, Otto Greter, Walter Widemann

Women's foil
 Anna Klüpfel
 Hedwig Rieder
 Victoria Hagemann

Gymnastics

Hockey

Modern pentathlon

Three male pentathletes represented Switzerland in 1948.

 Bruno Riem
 Franz Hegner
 Werner Schmid

Rowing

Switzerland had 19 male rowers participate in five out of seven rowing events in 1948.

 Men's single sculls
 Hansjakob Keller

 Men's double sculls
 Maurice Gueissaz
 Maurice Matthey

 Men's coxless pair
 Hans Kalt
 Josef Kalt

 Men's coxed four
 Rudolf Reichling
 Erich Schriever
 Émile Knecht
 Peter Stebler
 André Moccand (cox)

 Men's eight
 Otto Burri
 Fredy Schultheiss
 Franz Starkl
 Hans Schultheiss
 Arnold Amstutz
 Moritz Grand
 Peter Gübeli
 Eugen Vollmar
 Otto Vonlaufen (cox)

Sailing

Shooting

Seven shooters represented Switzerland in 1948. Emil Grünig won gold in the 300 metre rifle and Rudolf Schnyder won silver in the 50 metre pistol.

25 metre pistol
 Rudolf Schnyder
 Walter Lienhard

50 metre pistol
 Rudolf Schnyder
 Beat Rhyner
 Heinz Ambühl

300 metre rifle
 Emil Grünig
 Otto Horber
 Mario Ciocco

50 metre rifle
 Otto Horber
 Emil Grünig
 Mario Ciocco

Swimming

Water polo

Weightlifting

Wrestling

Art competitions

References

External links
Official Olympic Reports
International Olympic Committee results database

Nations at the 1948 Summer Olympics
1948
1948 in Swiss sport